James Lester Douglas (29 November 1881 – 30 September 1950) was a Liberal party member of the House of Commons of Canada. He was born in Head of Hillsborough, Prince Edward Island, the son of Elisha Albert Douglas and Emma Louise Coffin. He became an exporter and farmer by career.

He was educated at Charlottetown Business College. In 1910, Douglas received a Royal Humane Society Medal for life saving. He married Mabel Amanda Wright (1898–1969) on 17 May 1927.

He was first elected to Parliament at the Queen's riding in the 1940 general election and re-elected there in the 1945 and 1949 elections. Douglas died on 30 September 1950 before completing his term in the 21st Canadian Parliament.

References

External links
 

1881 births
1950 deaths
Canadian farmers
Liberal Party of Canada MPs
Members of the House of Commons of Canada from Prince Edward Island